P. H. Manoj Pandian (born 8 August 1971) is a politician and current Member of the Legislative Assembly for Alangulam constituency. He was elected to the Tamil Nadu legislative assembly as an Anna Dravida Munnetra Kazhagam candidate from Cheranmahadevi constituency in 2001 election and former Member of Parliament (Rajya Sabha) from 2010 to 2016.

Development Projects 
Allocated funds from MPLAD Funds for establishment of Mano College at a cost of Rs.3 crores,
has constructed various hospitals, school buildings, water tanks, community halls, college buildings and has upgraded several schools as a Member of Parliament and as a Member of Legislative assembly in the state of Tamil Nadu especially in the district of Tirunelveli. Has participated and headed various demonstrations and agitations under the leadership of Late Puratchithalaivi Dr. J.Jayalalitha, General Secretary of AIADMK and former Chief Minister of Tamil Nadu.

Family 
Great grandson of Rao Sahib G. Solomon, who was the First General Secretary of the YMCA; son of Dr. P. H. Pandian, who was Speaker of the Tamil Nadu Legislative Assembly 1984–89, Deputy Speaker of the Tamil Nadu Legislative Assembly 1980–1984, Member of Tamil Nadu Legislative Assembly 1977–1980, 1989–1991 [Anna Dravida Munnetra Kazhagam(Janaki Faction)] and Member of Parliament (Lok Sabha) 1999–2004; son of Dr. Cynthia Pandian, M.A., M.Ed., M.Phil., Ph.D.(Education), Fulbright Scholar, who was the Vice-Chancellor of Manonmaniam Sundaranar University, Tirunelveli, Vice-Chairperson of Tamil Nadu State Council for Higher Education (Tamil Nadu) and Director, Academic Staff College, University of Madras. Brother of Leading corporate Advocate Mr. P. H. Arvindh Pandian, Additional Advocate General, government of Tamil Nadu. Mrs Deepti Manoj Pandian, MBA – Wife, two daughters, Niranjana Pandian & Nivedhana Pandian.

Schooling 

 Balar Kalvi Nilayam (Anitha School from Nursery to 2nd Std)
 CSI Bain School, Kilpauk from 3rd Std to 5th Std.
 Don Bosco Matriculation Higher Secondary School, Egmore, Chennai (From 06th Std to 12th Std)

Educational qualifications 
Bachelor Of Law (B.L.), Madras Law College. M.L. (International and Constitutional Law) (Madras University).

Posts held 

 MP (Member of Parliament) Rajya Sabha from 2010 to 2016
 Member of the Petition Committee of the Parliament.
 Member of the Parliamentary Committee on  Science and Technology and Environment and Forests.
 Member of Consultative Committee,  Ministry of Civil Aviation of the Parliament.
 M.L.A. (Member of Legislative Assembly)  from 2001 to 2006 – Cheranmahadevi Constituency.

 Was the Chairman of the Tamil Nadu Legislative Assembly Estimates Committee.
 Was the Member of the Dr. Ambedkar University Senate
 Was a member of Ex-Servicemen Board

-

-

-

-

-

-

-

-

-

Party positions held 
 Member of AIADMK from 1993.

 Appointed Joint Secretary, AIADMK, Advocates Wings in 2000.
 Appointed Secretary, AIADMK, State Advocates Wings in 2007.
 Presently the Organizing Secretary of the AIADMK.

Electoral performance

Important conferences attended 
 Was sponsored by American Consulate on behalf of India to attend the International Youth Visitor Leadership Programme conducted in Washington, USA in the year 2009.
 Attended the" COP21 Summit on Climate Change" in Paris, France in 2015.

Associations 
 Member of Madras High Court Advocate Association
 Member of Madras Bar Association

References 

All India Anna Dravida Munnetra Kazhagam politicians
Living people
Rajya Sabha members from Tamil Nadu
1971 births
Don Bosco schools alumni
Tamil Nadu MLAs 2021–2026